When the Storm Fades is a Canadian docufiction film, directed by Seán Devlin and released in 2018. Described by Devlin as a "docudramedy" because it blends aspects of both docudrama and comedy-drama, the film is set in the Philippines in the aftermath of Typhoon Haiyan and depicts a family's attempts to recover from the disaster.

The film stars the real-life Pablo family from Leyte, and is improvised in part around their own real-life experience of the typhoon. Although the film's primary themes address climate change and the effort to recover from grief and loss, the film includes a secondary storyline which depicts two Canadian aid workers (Aaron Read and Kayla Lorette) whose attempts to play the "white savior" backfire.

The film premiered at the 2018 Vancouver International Film Festival.

Read won the award for Best Supporting Actor in a Canadian Film, and Lorette won the award for Best Supporting Actress in a Canadian Film, at the Vancouver Film Critics Circle Awards 2018. The film was also a nominee for Best British Columbia Film.

References

External links 
 

2018 films
Canadian docufiction films
Canadian comedy-drama films
English-language Canadian films
Films shot in the Philippines
Films set in the Philippines
2018 drama films
Films about Asian Canadians
1091 Pictures films
2010s English-language films
2010s Canadian films